Sazala (Saźalı) is a rural locality (a village) in Baydavletovsky Selsoviet, Zianchurinsky District, Bashkortostan, Russia. The population was 93 as of 2010. There is 1 street.

Geography 
Sazala is located 36 km northeast of Isyangulovo (the district's administrative centre) by road. Ibrayevo is the nearest rural locality.

References 

Rural localities in Zianchurinsky District